"Love Has a Mind of Its Own" is a song from She Works Hard for the Money, the 1983 album by Donna Summer. The song was written by Summer, Bruce Sudano and Michael Omartian, and produced by Omartian. It was issued as the third and final single in December 1983 by Mercury Records from the LP, all of which became chart hits in the US.

A ballad, it is performed as a duet with 2nd Chapter of Acts singer Matthew Ward, although he is uncredited on the sleeve. The single was released internationally in 1984, but had first been issued in this form in the US and Japan the previous year.

"Love Has a Mind of Its Own" charted on three U.S. charts.  It peaked at number 70 on the Billboard Hot 100 and number 35 on the US R&B chart. The song did best on the Adult Contemporary chart, where it reached number 19 and remained on the charts for 12 weeks.

Chart history

References

External links
 

Donna Summer songs
1983 songs
1984 singles
Songs written by Donna Summer
Songs written by Michael Omartian
Song recordings produced by Michael Omartian
Songs written by Bruce Sudano
Mercury Records singles
Pop ballads
Rhythm and blues ballads
Soul ballads
Male–female vocal duets
1980s ballads